The England Darts Organisation was formed in 2007. Previously England Darts was administered by the British Darts Organisation (BDO); however with the withdrawal of tobacco sponsorship the BDO withdrew its support for England.

In November 2006 the 43 member English counties of the BDO formed a steering committee to look at the feasibility of forming an independent England. The steering committee consisted of Peter Melton from Cambridgeshire the then existing England Team Manager, Vic Sexton (Sussex) the current England Youth Manager within the BDO Board of Directors, Ian Tilley from Lincolnshire and Colin Saunders from the Isle of Wight. Tommy Thompson Lancashire, who had 10 years earlier attempted to form an independent England, was approached to be part of the committee but had to decline due to an imminent terminal family illness.

In April 2007 the first England AGM took place at Canley Club in Coventry, where Tommy Thompson was elected chairman, Peter Melton International Director, Vic Sexton Tournament & Youth Director, Colin Saunders – Commercial Director, and John Peoples from Cleveland Communications Director. Sam Hawkins was elected Honorary President and Bobby George was elected Public Relations Executive. In 2009 Jean Thomas from Yorkshire replaced Colin Saunders on the board of directors and Bernie Crouch (Rutland) also joined the board as an executive member dealing with Technology. The England Board of Directors was increased to six people on 22 May 2011 at the England AGM, Bernie Crouch was elected to join the existing Board Members as Director of I.T.

Membership 

The 43 England counties compete in the British Inter-Counties Darts Championships each year between September and May.

Aims of the Organisation 
The England Darts Organisation was formed to raise finance that enables the England national teams to compete at international darts events around the world.

Events England compete in 
England competes in the British Internationals each year, with a separate Mens & Ladies Championships the Mens Championship consist of 12 players and Ladies 6 players, and takes place each April. The event is held by each of the three countries (England, Scotland & Wales) on a rotation basis. The event in 2011 was England's first opportunity at staging the championships and was held on 9 & 10 April 2011 at The Marine Hall & Waterfront Venue Fleetwood in Lancashire. England Mens & Ladies both won their respective Championships.

The Six Nation Championships take place each February with England taking their place alongside Wales, Scotland, Republic of Ireland, Northern Ireland and the Netherlands, the matches are played on a round-robin basis with separate events for Mens & Ladies and 4 players in the Mens event 2 in the Ladies. The event in 2011 was held at Erskine Bridge Glasgow Scotland, England men won the title and Wales ladies just took the Ladies title from England

The Europe Cup is bi-annual and features Mens, Ladies Championships

The World Cup is bi-annual and features Mens, Ladies, Boys, & Girls Championships. The World Cup in 2011 was held in the Republic of Ireland, with Scott Waites (Yorks), Tony O'Shea (Cheshire), Martin Atkins (Yorks) and Martin Adams (Cambs) and captain represented the Men's team, Trina Gulliver (Warwickshire) & Deta Hedman (Oxon) represented the Ladies team, with Fallon Sherrock (Bucks) and Jake Jones (Staffs) the youth team.

England created history by being the first team to win all the three categories, Scott Waites also won the World Cup Mens Singles title, with Trina Gulliver taking the Ladies title and Fallon Sherrock the Girls title.

Martin Adams and Tony O'Shea won the World Cup Pairs Mens title with Trina Gulliver & Deta Hedman the Ladies and Jake Jones and Fallon Sherrock the Youth team event. The event was attended by 39 countries including Iran, South Africa, USA, Canada as well as a number of European countries.

Events

England organise several events. The England Open, now run at The Bunn Leisure Holiday Centre, Selsey in Sussex during June, is the biggest open competition in the world for a comparable entry fee, and has been awarded a Category A status. The England Classic also takes place at Selsey in September each year; The England Masters and The England National Singles have enjoyed many venues, originally hosted at the Cheshire Conference Centre before moving in 2011 to the Norbreck Castle in Blackpool and in 2012 to an Olympic venue, the Ricoh Arena Coventry.

England also organise the England qualifiers into the Winmau World Masters Championships.

England have also set up a unique collaboration with the Welsh Darts Organisation to present the Anglo-Celtic-County-Cup, which is held in June for Inter-County Teams.

England Darts is now solely responsible for all aspects of the England international tams, where many of the stars of the World Championships can be seen each year on BBC TV, none more famous than Martin Adams & Trina Gulliver current champions of the World and respective England national team captains.

Roll of Honour

England Open

England Masters

England International Open

England Classic

England National Singles

England Matchplay

Isle of Man Festival

England Youth Grand Prix Grand Finals

England Youth Grand Prix of Darts Regional Qualification Events

England Youth Girls Pentathlon

England Youth Boys Pentathlon

England Online Youth Grand Prix Series 
Owing to the COVID-19 Pandemic putting normal darts events off the calendar for 2020 and the start of 2021 affected also, England Darts Organisation had decided to run a few online initiatives to encourage Youth Players and to provide a form guide leading to the international events in late 2021.

Boys Event

Girls Event

England Youth Diamond League 
Another initiative during the COVID-19 Pandemic for the Youth Players was the England Youth Diamond League, this 3-stage tournament begins with qualifying tournaments for players in which the winners qualify for stage 2 which was the ''League Stage'' which contains 8 Boys & 6 Girls with a £1,200 Prize Fund, each of the Boys and Girls will play each other player and the Top 4 Boys and Girls progress to the Finals Stage. The Qualifying Events take place in February 2021 and the Finals Stage in March 2021.

Boys Qualifying Events

Wildcard Entries 
The field for the Diamond League Group stage was topped up with two more Wildcards who were chosen based on their performances during the Qualifying Events, the two players chosen were:

Tavis Dudeney 

Leo Beechey

Boys Group Stages

Boys Knockout Stages

Girls Qualifying Events

Wildcard Entries 
The field for the Diamond League Group stage was topped up with two more Wildcards who were chosen based on their performances during the Qualifying Events, the two players chosen were:

Ffion Leigh-James 

Krystal O'Connor

Girls Group Stages

Girls Knockout Stages

Player appearances for England

England Youth Development Team

Youth Girls

Youth Boys

Senior Ladies 

Where a name is in brackets this is the ladies name that they played under, followed by their married name.
|}

Senior Mens 

Note: O'Regan was the first captain of an England team and also captained Ireland, his country of birth.

International performance of the national team since the formation of the England Darts Organisation in 2007 

The above information is all to be updated as new results are published or previous records are entered.

World Cup Performance

Europe Cup Performance
The Europe Cup is held bi-annually for Senior Teams, while the Youth event is held annually and is separate from the Senior event.

Six Nations Performance

British Internationals Performance

International Honours Since 2007 Formation

Six Nations Performance

External links
England Darts Organisation website
England Darts Organisation Facebook page

Darts organizations
Darts articles needing attention
2007 establishments in England
Sports organizations established in 2007
Darts in the United Kingdom
Darts